Women's General Association of Macau, or in short Women's Association, is a pro-Beijing political party in Macau, and is represented in the Legislative Assembly.

History 
Women's General Association of Macau was formed in 1950, advocating the unity of patriotic women in Macau, connecting women with different social backgrounds, and protecting female's right. The Association has positioned itself in pro-Beijing and pro-establishment camp, and regarded as in the traditional faction.

The Association formed electoral alliance with other pro-Beijing parties by 1992 under the name of "Progress Promotion Union". The Association separated from the Union in 2017 and ran in the poll as "Alliance for a Happy Home". The Association returned the parliament with two members in 2021, the best result after the split.

Leadership 
The leadership of the 36th Council and Supervisory Board members:

 Leader: Ho Teng-iat
 Chairperson: Lam Un-mui
 Secretary-general:

Electoral performance

Elected members 
Members elected under UGAMM ticket are not shown.

 Wong Kit-cheng, 2017 - incumbent
 Ma Io-fong, 2021 - incumbent

References 

Political parties in Macau
History of women in Macau